Kim Ho-sun (born 9 March 1941) is a South Korean film director, producer, and screenwriter who has enjoyed both critical and box office success.

Biography
Kim Ho-sun was born 9 March 1941 in South Hamgyong Province, now part of North Korea. He dropped out of Kyung Hee University and made his directorial debut in 1974 with Hwannyeo.

A member of the so-called "Visual Age" of Korean directors, Kim made some of the bestselling Korean films of the 1970s. The local Korean cinema industry in the 1970s had to face the challenges of foreign imports, increased television ownership, and the stifling censorship of the military dictatorship of Park Chung-hee.

Kim began his directing career making what are known as "hostess films," one of the few genres that the censors allowed some latitude to, these were melodramas that portrayed the lives of bargirls and their milieu. Kim showed that despite the formulaic restrictions the censors placed on filmmaking, locally made films could still be individual and sell well, and in doing so inspired his fellow filmmakers. In terms of tickets sold, Winter Woman that he directed in 1977 was the bestselling domestic film of the 1970s, and would hold the record until General's Son in 1990.

Since 2007, Kim has been a senior advisor to the Korea Film Directors' Society (KFDS).

Filmography

Awards and nominations

References

External links
 
 

1941 births
Living people
South Korean film directors
South Korean screenwriters
South Korean film producers
Kyung Hee University alumni
Best Director Paeksang Arts Award (film) winners